The Togo women's national handball team is the national team of Togo. It is governed by the Federation Togolaise de Handball  and takes part in international handball competitions.

African Championship record
1979 – 7th
1996 – 7th

External links
IHF profile

Women's national handball teams
Handball
National team